Typhlacontias is a genus of legless, burrowing skinks in the family Scincidae, a genus endemic to Sub-Saharan Africa. Its sister group is the clade consisting of the genera Feylinia and Melanoseps.

Species
Seven species are recognized as being valid:

Typhlacontias brevipes  – FitzSimon's burrowing skink, short blind dart skink
Typhlacontias gracilis  – Roux's blind dart skink
Typhlacontias johnsonii  – Johnson's western burrowing skink
Typhlacontias kataviensis  – Katavi blind dart skink
Typhlacontias punctatissimus  – dotted blind dart skink, speckled western burrowing skink
Typhlacontias rohani  – Rohan's blind dart skink
Typhlacontias rudebecki  – Rudebeck's western burrowing skink

References

Further reading
Bocage JVB ("1872" [1873]). "Mélanges erpétologiques. II. Sur quelques Reptiles et Batraciens nouveaux, rares ou peu connus d'Afrique occidentale ". Jornal de Sciencias Mathematicas Physicas e Naturaes, Academia Real das Sciencias de Lisboa 4: 209–227. (Typhlacontias, new genus, p. 213). (in French).

Typhlacontias
Lizard genera
Skinks of Africa
Taxa named by José Vicente Barbosa du Bocage